Geng Tan (born 1963) is a Canadian engineer and former politician who served as the member of Parliament (MP) for Don Valley North from 2015 to 2019. A member of the Liberal Party, Tan is the first Mandarin-speaker to be elected to the House of Commons.

Early life and career 
Tan was born in 1963 in Hunan, China. He earned a Bachelor of Engineering from Hunan University in China, majoring in organic chemical engineering. Tan went on to obtain his certification as a senior engineer and held various managerial positions. He came to Canada on a student visa in 1998, attending the University of Toronto and completed a Master of Applied Science and doctorate in chemical engineering and applied chemistry.

Tan worked at Atomic Energy of Canada Limited (AECL) and Ontario Power Generation (OPG) as a nuclear scientist.

Tan founded the Council of Newcomer Organizations and is a former vice-chair of the Confederation of Toronto Chinese Canadian Organizations. Tan was the recipient of both the Ontario Service Award and the Queen Elizabeth Diamond Jubilee Medal for his service to Canada.

Political career
In the 2015 Canadian federal election, Tan was elected for the riding of Don Valley North. He is the first elected MP born in Mainland China who speaks Mandarin.

According to a Canadian Security Intelligence Service report described by Global News intelligence sources, Tan was prepared to accept a 2018 invitation to travel to Taiwan, but was persuaded not to do so by Liberal MPPs Michael Chan and Han Dong.

In December 2018, Tan announced that he would be seeking re-election in the 2019 Canadian federal election. In May 2019 reports surfaced on WeChat and Chinese media that Tan was having an affair. Tan denied the accusations. On June 16, 2019, Tan announced that he would not run for re-election. On June 25, 2019, the National Post broke the news in English-language media and reported that a former constituency staffer had accused him of refusing to pay child support for a child fathered via in vitro fertilization while they were in a relationship. Tan denied the accusations, saying that he had only consented to donating sperm to her, and said he would fight the case in court. 

Tan's wife Xinglai Laura Huang, a scientist with Environment Canada, ran for the Liberal nomination to replace Tan, but was barred from running by the party. He was ultimately succeeded by Dong, who had the support of Liberal insider Chan. On February 2023, Global News reported that its intelligence sources said that Tan's ouster as an MP was possibly arranged by Chan in favour of Dong, because Beijing did not like what Tan was doing. Chan, Dong, and the Chinese embassy denied the accusations.

Electoral record

References

External links
 

1963 births
Living people
Canadian chemists
Chemists from Beijing
Politicians from Beijing
Chinese emigrants to Canada
Hunan University alumni
Liberal Party of Canada MPs
Members of the House of Commons of Canada from Ontario
Politicians from Toronto
Scientists from Toronto
University of Toronto alumni
21st-century Canadian politicians
Canadian politicians of Chinese descent